Events from the year 1991 in the United Kingdom.

Incumbents
 Monarch – Elizabeth II
 Prime Minister –  John Major (Conservative)
 Parliament – 50th

Events

January
 January – Tax-exempt special savings accounts (TESSAs) introduced as a government concession to promote personal savings.
 3 January – The UK expels all Iraqi diplomats from the country due to the Iraqi government's illegal annexation of Kuwait five months earlier.
 5 January – 27 people die as a result of gale-force winds across Britain.
 8 January – A train crash at Cannon Street station in London kills one person and injures over 500.
 11 January – As the recession deepens, 335 employees at the Peugeot car factory in Coventry are made redundant, while Ford is looking for up to 1,000 voluntary redundancies at its British factories. Thousands of jobs in the financial services factor are reportedly at threat, as the total UK unemployment figure is currently standing at nearly 1,800,000, but is expected to rise to well over 2,000,000 by the end of the year.
 14 January – Donald Coleman, Labour MP for Neath in South Wales, dies aged 65.
 16 January – The final phase of the M40 motorway through Oxfordshire is opened, giving the West Midlands conurbation its first direct motorway link with London.
 17 January – The Gulf War begins, as the Royal Air Force joins Allied aircraft in bombing raids on Iraq.
 18 January – In spite of the deepening recession, the Conservatives have climbed back to the top of the opinion polls, a MORI poll placing them five points ahead of Labour on 46%.
 19 January – It is announced that unemployment has reached more than 1.8 million, and experts warn that the figure will exceed 2 million later this year.
 29 January – John Major resists calls from the Labour Party for interest rates to be cut, in a bid to combat the recession.

February
 7 February – The Provisional Irish Republican Army launch a mortar attack against 10 Downing Street, blowing in all the windows of the cabinet room, during a session of the War Cabinet, but there are no injuries.
 8 February – Heavy snow disrupts the country for a second time during the winter 1990–1991 season as Britain experiences a prolonged cold snap.
 17 February – Barclays Bank is reported to be on the verge of axing more than 13,000 employees.
 18 February – A man is killed in the Victoria station and Paddington station bombings.
 25 February – Alan Green, Director of Public Prosecution, announces that the Birmingham Six could soon be free from prison after seventeen years as their convictions for terrorism and mass murder are no longer considered safe and satisfactory.
 26 February – British scientist Tim Berners-Lee introduces WorldWideWeb, the first web browser, while working at CERN in Geneva, the first website goes online on 6 August.
 27 February – The National Institute of Economic and Social Research predicts that the recession will end this summer.
 28 February – Iraq accepts a provisional ceasefire, and British troops halt their advance on Baghdad.

March 
 3 March – An Ipsos MORI poll shows that John Major is more popular with his voters than his Conservative government.
 8 March – Ribble Valley, the tenth safest Conservative constituency in Britain, is won by the Liberal Democrats in a by-election.
 10 March – The UK reportedly has the fastest pace in rising unemployment of all the European Community countries.
 14 March – The Birmingham Six are freed after the Court of Appeal quashes their convictions over the 1974 pub bombings in Birmingham which killed 21 people and injured more than 160 others.
 15 March – Unemployment is now above 2,000,000 for the first time in two years. The number of British workers employed in the manufacturing industry has fallen below 5,000,000 for the first time since records began.
 19 March – Norman Lamont predicts 2% economic contraction for this year.
 21 March – Education Secretary Kenneth Clarke announces plans to remove further education and sixth form colleges from local authority control.
 23 March
 The Government launches its Citizen's Charter campaign.
 John Major announces the abolition of the Community Charge.
 28 March – An inquest in Sheffield into the Hillsborough disaster records a verdict of accidental death on the 95 people who died as a result of the tragedy in 1989. Many of the victims' families criticise the verdict in open court, as many of them had been hoping for a verdict of unlawful killing, or an open verdict, and for criminal charges to be brought against the police officers who patrolled the game.
 29 March – Sir John Stradling Thomas, Conservative MP for Monmouth, dies aged 65.

April
 4 April
 Social services in the Orkney Islands are criticised for their handling of more than 100 children who have returned to their families after being taken away over allegations of child abuse.
 Labour retains the Neath constituency at a by-election with the LabourParty candidate Peter Hain, receiving more than half of the vote.
 8 April – The Football Association announces plans for a new "super league" of eighteen clubs to replace the Football League First Division as the highest division of English football. The move is attacked by smaller Football League clubs, who fear that they could go out of business if TV revenue was confined to the proposed super league.
 18 April – Despite the continuing recession, the Conservatives are still top of the opinion polls as the latest MORI poll puts them two points ahead of Labour on 42%. The Liberal Democrats have trebled their showing in the last fifteen months, now gaining 15% of the vote.
 19 April – George Carey is enthroned as Archbishop of Canterbury.
 23 April – The government confirms that the unpopular Community Charge is to be replaced by a new Council Tax in 1993.

May
 5 May – Hopes for a quick end to the recession are boosted by CBI predictions that a sharp recovery in business profits will begin shortly.
 6 May - Arsenal are crowned champions of the Football League.
 15 May – Manchester United win the European Cup Winners' Cup with a 2–1 win over FC Barcelona of Spain in Rotterdam, the Netherlands. Mark Hughes scores both of their goals to give English clubs a winning return to European competitions after their five-year ban was lifted last year.
 16 May – Unemployment is now at 2,175,000 – the highest figure since late-1988. It is also above the European average for the first time since 1987.
 17 May – The Conservatives are defeated at another by-election, when Labour gain the Monmouth seat in Wales.
 18 May
 Helen Sharman becomes the first British person in space, flying with the Soyuz TM-12 mission.
 Tottenham Hotspur win the FA Cup for a record eighth time with a 2–1 win over Nottingham Forest. Midfielder Paul Gascoigne, a multimillion-pound transfer target for Italian side Lazio, suffers cruciate knee ligament damage early in the game and is not expected to play again in 1991. 
 21 May – South Wales, which has some of the worst unemployment rates in Britain, receives a boost when the go-ahead is given for Japanese electrical company Sony to build a new factory in Bridgend that will create 1,400 jobs when it opens in 1993.
 22 May – Nearly six months after the breakthrough in the Channel Tunnel service tunnel, the breakthrough in the North rail tunnel is achieved. On the same day, road links to the British terminal are improved when the final section of the M20 motorway is opened between Maidstone and Ashford, meaning that the tunnel's unbroken motorway link with London has already been completed an estimated three years before the first trains move between Britain and France.
 24 May
 Labour tops a MORI poll for the first time this year, as they stand six points ahead of the Conservatives on 43%.
 Sutton Manor Colliery at Bold in the Lancashire Coalfield closes, the last in Britain to use a steam winding engine.
 27 May – Eric Heffer, Labour MP for Liverpool Walton, dies after a long battle against cancer.
 29 May – Economists warn that the economy is still in an "exceptionally steep" recession and that it could be another year before the first real signs of recovery become visible.

June
 June – Kia, the Korean car company, begin importing cars to the United Kingdom for the first time, initially it will only import the Pride (a rebadged version of the Japanese Mazda 121), but at least one further model is expected to join it by 1994.
 3 June – The British Army kill three IRA gunmen in Northern Ireland.
 6 June – Labour Party leader Neil Kinnock condemns John Major for high interest rates, as much as 17%, being charged on small businesses by banks.
 10 June – The National Gallery (London) opens its new Sainsbury Wing to the public.
 13 June – Unemployment reaches 2.25million, the lowest monthly rise reported this year.
 14 June – Julie Ann Gibson becomes the first woman to qualify as a pilot with the Royal Air Force.
 19 June – Secretary of State for Employment Michael Howard announces a £230,000,000 plan to tackle rising unemployment.
 25 June – Nissan, the Japanese carmaker with a plant at Sunderland, starts "price wars" by reducing the cost of its cars in order to boost flagging sales brought on by the recession.
 28 June
 Seven months after her resignation as Prime Minister, Margaret Thatcher announces that she will stand down as a Member of parliament at the next general election, which has to be held within the next twelve months.
 The final breakthrough in the Channel Tunnel is achieved when the last section of clay in the South rail tunnel is bored away.

July
 July
South African-produced cars are imported to Britain for the first time, with the launch of the Sao Penza, a rebadged version of the Mazda 323. However, the brand and the car is not a success and imports end just 2 years later.
Production of the Vauxhall Belmont compact saloon ends ahead of the launch of the third generation Astra range of hatchbacks and estates which goes the sale in the Autumn with saloon and convertible models arriving later. 
 3 July – Michael Shorey is convicted at the Old Bailey of the July 1990 murders of Elaine Forsyth and Patricia Morrison, two estate agents with whom he shared a basement flat in north London. He is sentenced to two terms of life imprisonment. The former EastEnders actress Sandy Ratcliff, who provided Shorey with an alibi on the night of the murders, is subsequently convicted of perjury.
 4 July – Labour retains the Walton seat at a by-election, with new MP Peter Kilfoyle gaining more than half of the vote.
 5 July – The Bank of England closes down the Bank of Credit and Commerce International amid fraud allegations. Several local authorities in the UK lose millions of pounds in investments held with the bank.
 8 July – Two suspected IRA terrorists shoot their way out of Brixton Prison in London.
 11 July – Labour MP, Terry Fields, joins the list of people jailed for refusal to pay the poll tax after he receives a sixty-day prison sentence. He is the first MP to be jailed for refusing to pay the controversial tax which was introduced early last year.
 15 July – 17th G7 summit held in London.
 16 July – A government survey of children's school reading reveals that Roald Dahl, who died eight months earlier, has now overtaken Enid Blyton as the most popular author of children's books.
 17 July – The Ultimate steel roller coaster, Europe's longest, opens at Lightwater Valley theme park in North Yorkshire.
 18 July – Economists warn that unemployment will reach 3,000,000 people (a level not seen since early-1987) by the end of next year.
 19 July – Dean Saunders becomes the most expensive footballer to be signed by an English club when he joins Liverpool in a £2.9million transfer from Derby County.
 23 July – The Ministry of Defence proposes the merge of 22 army regiments as part of a general reform programme.
 24 July – Chancellor Norman Lamont assures the House of Commons that the economic recovery will begin before the end of this year.

August
 8 August – John McCarthy, a British hostage held in Lebanon for over five years is freed.
 12 August – The Times reports that every job vacancy is being chased by 22 applicants.
 16 August – The Bank of England declares that the worst of the current recession is now over.
 23 August – Growing confidence over economic recovery has helped boost the Conservative government's popularity, as they return to the top of the MORI poll with a two-point lead over Labour putting them on 42%.
 30 August
 Scottish runner Liz McColgan becomes the first British gold medalist at the World Athletics Championships in Tokyo, Japan.
 Rioting breaks out on the Ely council estate in Cardiff.

September
 September – Gordon Roddick and A. John Bird launch The Big Issue, a then-monthly magazine to be sold by homeless people in response to growing number of rough sleepers on the streets of London.
 3 September – Following the recent outbreaks of violence in Leeds and Cardiff, rioting breaks out at Handsworth in Birmingham, Kates Hill in Dudley and Blackbird Leys in Oxford.
 9 September – Rioting breaks out on the Meadow Well council estate on Tyneside, with local youths attacking police officers following the recent death of two local teenagers in a police pursuit. Racially motivated attacks on Asian owned shops also involve looting and arson.
 12 September – Unemployment has hit 2,400,000 – the highest level since the spring of 1988 – completing a 50% rise in just over a year. However, the rate of rising unemployment is slowing down and retail sales are improving.
 13 September – Further rioting breaks out in Tyneside.
 14 September – George Buckley, Labour MP for Hemsworth in West Yorkshire, dies aged 56.
 15 September – A poll shows that Labour Party leader Neil Kinnock is a liability to his party, who are now behind John Major's Conservative Party in the opinion polls.
 17 September – Neil Kinnock hits out at claims that he is to blame for his party falling behind in the opinion polls, sparking speculation that John Major will call a general election within the next two months.
 19 September – Robin Leigh-Pemberton, governor of the Bank of England, says that he is confident the recession is now over in Britain.
 20 September – Richard Holt, Conservative MP for Langbaurgh in Cleveland, dies suddenly aged 60.
 25 September – Kidnappers in Beirut release elderly hostage Jackie Mann after over two years in captivity.

October
 October – Vauxhall launches the third generation of its popular Astra with hatchback and estate models with the saloon and convertible models arriving later. 
 2 October – Just over two weeks after Neil Kinnock was damned by a poll as a "liability" to the Labour Party, the leader and his MPs are celebrating after they overtake the Conservatives by two points in the opinion polls.
 9 October – The first Sumo tournament to be held outside Japan is hosted at the Royal Albert Hall in London.
 11 October – John Major outlines his vision of a "classless" Britain at a Conservative Party conference at Blackpool, where his predecessor Margaret Thatcher voices her support for him.
 16 October – The ITV franchise auction results are announced and many notable names will go off the air, including Thames Television, TVS, TSW, TV-am and ORACLE Teletext. The changes will take effect at midnight on 1 January 1993. 
 17 October – The smallest monthly rise in unemployment since last November is cited by the government as an "unmistakable" sign that the recession is drawing to a close.
 18 October – Labour's hopes of election success are boosted by the latest MORI poll, which shows them six points ahead of the Conservatives on 45%.
 19 October – Canadian singer Bryan Adams makes history when his hit single (Everything I Do) I Do It for You, which features in the film Robin Hood:Prince of Thieves (released on 14 June this year, and starring Kevin Costner) enters its fifteenth successive week at #1 in the UK singles charts.
 22 October – Leonora Knatchbull, the five-year-old daughter of Norton Knatchbull, 8th Baron Brabourne and his wife Penelope, dies after a one-year battle with kidney cancer. She was also a great-grandchild of Lord Louis Mountbatten, who was murdered by the IRA in 1979. She is buried at Romsey Abbey on 26 October.
 23 October – In the legal case of R v R decided on appeal, the Law Lords unanimously decide that spousal rape is a crime in England and Wales, overturning the principle established by Chief Justice Hale in 1736.
 27 October – (Everything I Do) I Do It For You, the power ballad performed by Canadian singer Bryan Adams, loses its position at #1 on the singles charts after a record sixteen consecutive weeks, displaced by U2's The Fly.
 29 October – Hopes that the recession is drawing to a close are boosted by CBI findings, which show that manufacturers are now more optimistic than at any time in the past three years.

November
 November
 Computer retailer PC World opens its first branch in Croydon, Surrey.
 Alan Sked forms the Anti-Federalist League, a political party aiming to field election candidates opposed to the Maastricht Treaty.
 5 November – Robert Maxwell, owner of numerous business interests including the Daily Mirror newspaper, is found dead off the coast of Tenerife; his cause of death is unconfirmed, but reports suggest that he has committed suicide.
 7 November – Labour retains control of Hemsworth at the by-election, with new MP Derek Enright, while the Liberal Democrats gain Kincardine and Deeside from the Conservatives at another by-election. A third by-election sees the Conservatives lose the Langbaurgh constituency to Labour, with 35-year-old Indian-born candidate Ashok Kumar becoming the new MP.
 9 November – First ever controlled and substantial production of fusion energy achieved at the Joint European Torus in Oxford.
 15 November – Britain's hopes of economic recovery are dealt with a major blow when shares on the Wall Street Stock Exchange fall by 120 points.
 16 November – Two IRA bombers die in St Albans, Hertfordshire, when a bomb explodes prematurely.
 18 November – Terry Waite, a British hostage held in Lebanon, is freed after four-and-a-half years in captivity.
 22–23 November – The Communist Party of Great Britain votes to abandon its Marxist-Leninist constitution and reform itself as Democratic Left.
 23 November – Freddie Mercury, the lead singer of rock band Queen, announces that he is suffering from AIDS, following lengthy media speculation about his health.
 24 November – Freddie Mercury dies at his home in London, just 24 hours after going public with the news that he was suffering from AIDS.
 25 November – The Court of Appeal quashes the convictions of Winston Silcott, Engin Raghip and Mark Braithwaite, for the murder of PC Keith Blakelock in the Broadwater Farm riot at Tottenham, North London, six years ago. Raghip and Braithwaite are released from prison, but Silcott remains imprisoned for a separate murder.
 26 November – Julin Bristol, the last UK nuclear test, takes place at the Nevada Test Site.
 27 November
 Freddie Mercury is cremated after a funeral service held at West London Crematorium.
 The government announces that joyriders who are found guilty should face a maximum penalty of five years imprisonment as well as unlimited fines and unlimited automatic driving bans. Joyriding has recently surged across Britain, with almost all of those involved being children and teenagers.
 28 November – First performance of Alan Bennett's play The Madness of George III in London.

December
 1 December – Thousands of British shops, including retail giants Asda and Tesco, defy trading laws, and open their doors on a Sunday in a bid to boost trade that has been badly hit by the ongoing recession.
 5 December – The Robert Maxwell business empire goes into receivership with debts in excess of £1,000,000,000, exactly one month after Robert Maxwell's death. The Daily Mirror reports that Maxwell had wrongly removed £350,000,000 from its pension fund shortly before he died.
 10 December – Ronald Coase wins the Nobel Prize in Economics "for his discovery and clarification of the significance of transaction costs and property rights for the institutional structure and functioning of the economy".
 12–15 December – Concentration of vehicle exhausts in London causes an estimated 160 deaths.
 16 December – Stella Rimington announced as the first female director general of MI5.
 19 December – Unemployment is now above 2,500,000 for the first time since early-1988.
 23 December – Bohemian Rhapsody returns to the top of the British singles charts after sixteen years, with the proceeds from the rerelease being donated to the Terence Higgins Trust.
 27 December – The last MORI poll of 1991 shows that Labour are six points ahead of the Conservatives with 44% of the vote.
 29 December – A quarterly opinion poll shows that Neil Kinnock and Labour are three points ahead of John Major and the Conservatives, sparking hope for Labour that they will win the next general election (which has to be held within five months) or at least the election will result in a hung parliament for the first time since 1974.

Undated
 The economy remains rooted in the recession which began last year.
 Despite the deepening recession, inflation has been substantially decreased to 5.9%.
 The National Curriculum assessment ("standard attainment tests" or SATs) is first carried out, at Key Stage 1 in primary schools in England.
 One Canada Square at Canary Wharf in London becomes the tallest building in the UK.
 Scout Groups may admit girls to all their sections.
 Despite the onset of the recession and a sharp fall in new car sales (with fewer than 1,600,000 new cars being sold in 1991 compared to the record of more than 2,300,000 in 1989), Nissan Motor Manufacturing UK's car plant at Sunderland returns a profit for the first time, making £18,400,000 this year. It currently only makes the Primera family saloon and hatchbacks there, but from August next year it will be joined by the new version of the smaller Micra.
 Sea defences at Mappleton in Holderness are built.

Publications
 Martin Amis's novel Time's Arrow.
 Beryl Bainbridge's novel The Birthday Boys.
 Iain M. Banks' short story collection The State of the Art.
 Pat Barker's novel Regeneration.
 Louis de Bernières' novel Señor Vivo and the Coca Lord.
 Brian Keenan's autobiographical account of more than four years as a hostage in Lebanon An Evil Cradling
 Terry Pratchett's Discworld novels Reaper Man and Witches Abroad.

Births

January

 2 January – Ben Hardy, Actor
 12 January – Pixie Lott, Singer
 13 January – Genevieve Gaunt, Actress
 15 January – Danny Addy, Professional Footballer
 18 January – Matthew Kane, Actor
 20 January
 Tom Cairney, Professional Footballer
 Jolyon Palmer, Professional Racing Driver, Motorsport Commentator, and Columnist
 21 January – Ben Bowns, Professional Hockey Player
 22 January – Alex MacDowall, Professional Racing Driver
 24 January – Nadene Caldwell, Professional Futsal Player
 25 January – Fergus Bell, Professional Footballer
 26 January – Nico Mirallegro, Actor
 29 January – Hugh Grosvenor, Aristocrat, Billionaire and Businessman

February

 2 February
 Lloyd Ashley, footballer
 Chris Baker, high jumper
 5 February – Sam Corcoran, footballer
 7 February – Holly Clyburn, golfer
 11 February – Georgia May Foote, actress
 17 February
 Ed Sheeran, singer/songwriter
 Bonnie Wright, actress
 18 February – Henry Surtees, racing driver (died 2009)
 20 February – Jocelyn Rae, English-Scottish tennis player
 21 February – Joe Alwyn, actor and model
 24 February – Hannah Clowes, gymnast
 26 February – Calum Butcher, footballer

March

 6 March – Matthew Briggs, English-born Guyanese Professional Footballer
 10 March
 Kadeena Cox, Paralympic Sprinter and Cyclist
 Usman Khan, Islamic terrorist and perpetrator of the 2019 London Bridge stabbing (died 2019)
 11 March
 Tammy Beaumont, Professional Cricketer
 Jack Rodwell, Professional Footballer
 14 March – Jake Ball, Professional Cricketer
 17 March – Daisy Head, Actress
 22 March – Ashley Eastham, Professional Footballer
 26 March – Andrea Atzeni, Italian-born Jockey
 27 March – Chloe Marshall, Model

April

 3 April – Mitch Austin, American Football player
 5 April – Nathaniel Clyne, footballer
 7 April – Anne-Marie, singer
 8 April – Liam Boyce, footballer
 19 April – Steve Cook, footballer
 20 April – Marissa King, Gymnast
 21 April 
 Frank Dillane, actor
 Max Chilton, racing driver
 23 April – Nathan Baker, footballer
 26 April
 Nathan Buck, cricketer
 Will Heard, singer/songwriter
 27 April – Rebecca Ryan, actress
 29 April – Adam Smith, footballer
 30 April – Moses Boyd, jazz drummer

May

 3 May – Carlo Acutis, England-born Italian Catholic computer programmer, beatified (died 2006 in Italy)
 6 May – Siobhan Williams, actress
 13 May
 Jen Beattie, footballer
 Jack Brereton, politician
 14 May – Chantelle Cameron, boxer
 17 May – Ashley Bryant, decathlete
 22 May – Kyle Bartley, footballer
 26 May – Samuel Ross, fashion designer, creative director and artist
 30 May
 Elijah Baker, actor, writer and director
 Callum Booth, footballer

June

 3 June – Nicky Clark, footballer
 8 June – Qasim Akhtar, actor
 11 June – Dan Howell, YouTuber, radio presenter
 13 June – Lyndon Arthur, boxer
 14 June – Jesy Nelson, singer/songwriter
 15 June – Sam Billings, cricketer
 16 June – Joe McElderry, singer
 17 June – Staz Nair, actor and singer
 21 June
 Jake Ball, rugby player
 Georgina Hagen, actress and singer
 22 June – Katie Jarvis, actress
 24 June – Yasmin Paige, actress
 26 June – Josh Charnley, footballer
 27 June
 Dan Osborne, television personality
 Oliver Stark, actor
 28 June
 Will Stevens, racing driver
 George Webster, actor
 30 June – David Witts, actor

July

 2 July – Jordan Bowery, Professional Footballer
 6 July – Ashley Lloyd, Actor and Dancer
 8 July – Jamie Blackley, Manx-born Actor
 13 July – Martin Joseph Ward, Professional Boxer
 15 July
 Lennox Clarke, Professional Boxer
 Josh Cook, Professional Racing Driver
 16 July – Andros Townsend, Professional Footballer
 21 July – Blanco White, Singer/Songwriter
 24 July – Jacob Banks, Nigerian-born Singer/Songwriter
 30 July – Diana Vickers, Singer

August

 4 August – Lucinda Dryzek, Actress
 8 August – Tony Clay, Actor
 9 August – Alice Barlow, Actress and Singer
 10 August – Michael Dapaah, Rapper and Comedian
 15 August – Ellen Gandy, Swimmer
 16 August – Tom Bristow, Professional Rugby Player
 18 August – George Atkins, Professional Cyclist
 22 August – Joe Arundel, Professional Footballer
 24 August – Chris Brookes, Professional Wrestler
 25 August – Luke Ayling, Professional Footballer
 26 August – Tommy Bastow, Actor and Musician
 29 August – Ryan J. Brown, Screenwriter

September

 1 September – Rhys Bennett, professional footballer
 2 September
 Lucy Armstrong, composer
 Damson Idris, actor and producer
 3 September – Ellary White, English footballer
 5 September – Skandar Keynes, actor
 6 September – Drew Cheshire, professional footballer
 8 September – Joe Sugg, YouTuber
 11 September – Luke Hubbins, professional footballer
 13 September – Sonny Bradley, professional footballer
 20 September – Izzy Christiansen, professional footballer
 24 September – Owen Farrell, professional rugby player
 26 September – Charlotte Spencer, actress

October

 1 October – Gus Kenworthy, British-born, American Olympic Freestyle Skier, Actor, and YouTuber
 2 October – Gordon Reid, Scottish Wheelchair Tennis Player
 4 October – Leigh-Anne Pinnock, Singer/Songwriter
 9 October – Danny Ansell, Professional Footballer
 10 October – Kate Avery, Professional Long-Distance Runner
 14 October
 Andrew Butchart, Olympic Runner
 Shona McGarty, Actress
 25 October – Omar Beckles, Professional Footballer
 28 October – Lucy Bronze, Professional Footballer
 29 October 
Grant Hall, Professional Footballer
Toby Tarrant, Radio Broadcaster

November

 2 November – Holly Bradshaw, Olympic Pole Vaulter
 4 November – Michael Jacobs, Professional Footballer
 6 November – George Bowerman, Professional Footballer
 8 November
 Elinor Crawley, Actress
 Daniel Middleton, YouTuber
 11 November – Emma Blackery, Singer/Songwriter, Youtube Vlogger, Record Producer, and Author
 21 November
 Nathan Cameron, Professional Footballer
 Lewis Dunk, Professional Footballer
 22 November – Kadeen Corbin, Professional Netball Player
 28 November – Scott Allan, Professional Footballer
 30 November – Ryan Bowman, Professional Footballer

December

 4 December – Aiden Grimshaw, singer
 6 December – Rachel Daly, footballer
 11 December – Rebecca Chin, Paralympic rower
 15 December – Joe Collister, professional footballer
 16 December – Charlie Clare, professional rugby player
 18 December – Marcus Butler, model and YouTuber
 19 December – Declan Galbraith, singer
 24 December – Louis Tomlinson, singer and member of One Direction
 30 December – Eddie Battye, professional footballer

Full date unknown
 Sheila Atim, Ugandan-born Actress, Singer, Composer, and Playwright
 Elliot Barnes-Worrell, Actor

Deaths

 8 January – Steve Clark, guitarist (Def Leppard) (born 1960)
 11 January 
 Charles Mozley, artist (born 1914)
 Sir Alec Rose, sailor (born 1908)
 14 January – Donald Coleman, politician (born 1925)
 20 January – Alfred Wainwright, author and illustrator (born 1907)
 21 February – Dame Margot Fonteyn, ballet dancer (born 1919)
 16 March – Rowland Baring, 3rd Earl of Cromer, central banker and diplomat (b. 1918)
 21 March – George Abecassis, race car driver (born 1913)
 24 March – Maudie Edwards, actress and singer (born 1906)
 3 April – Graham Greene, author (born 1904); died in Switzerland
 16 April – David Lean, film director and producer (born 1908)
 18 April –  Martin Hannett, record producer (born 1948)
 20 April – Steve Marriott, singer, musician (Small Faces and Humble Pie) (born 1947)
 18 May – Muriel Box, film director and screenwriter (born 1905)
 22 May – Stan Mortensen, footballer (born 1921)
 31 May – Angus Wilson, novelist and short story writer (born 1913)
 14 June
 Dame Peggy Ashcroft, actress (born 1907)
 Bernard Miles, Baron Miles, actor and director (born 1907)
 15 June – Arthur Lewis, economist, Nobel Prize laureate (born 1915)
 9 July – Frank Carr, sailor and founder of the Maritime Trust (born 1903)
 30 July – Arthur Rook, dermatologist (born 1918)
 12 August – Edward George Bowen, CBE, physicist (born 1911)
 30 August – Cyril Knowles, footballer (born 1944)
 16 September – Carol White, actress (born 1943)
 27 September 
 Roy Fuller, poet (born 1912)
Joe Hulme, former footballer and cricketer (born 1904)
 13 October – Donald Houston, actor (born 1923)
 27 October 
George Barker, poet (born 1913)
Sir Andrzej Panufnik, composer and musician (born 1914, Poland)
 5 November – Robert Maxwell, media proprietor (born 1923, Czechoslovakia)
 14 November – Tony Richardson, film director (born 1928)
 24 November – Freddie Mercury, singer (Queen) (born 1946)
 4 December – Cliff Bastin, former footballer (born 1912)
 6 December – Richard Stone, economist, Nobel Prize laureate (born 1913)
14 December – John Arlott, journalist, author and cricket commentator (born 1914)

See also
 1991 in British music
 1991 in British television
 List of British films of 1991

References

 
Years of the 20th century in the United Kingdom
United Kingdom